Machine Gun: The Fillmore East First Show is a live album by Jimi Hendrix, featuring songs recorded during the first set at the Fillmore East in New York City on December 31, 1969.  Hendrix is backed by Billy Cox on bass and Buddy Miles on drums, a lineup frequently referred to as the Band of Gypsys. Except for "Hear My Train A Comin'" and "Lover Man", the eleven songs represent new material that had not been performed by the Jimi Hendrix Experience.

The album further documents Hendrix's first of four sets on New Year's Eve and New Year's Day with the Band of Gypsys.  It adds to the previously released material on Band of Gypsys (1970), Band of Gypsys 2 (1986), Live at the Fillmore East (1999), and West Coast Seattle Boy: The Jimi Hendrix Anthology (2010).  All of the tracks, except for "Hear My Train A Comin'", "Changes" and "Izabella", appear for the first time on an official release. As of November 22, 2019, they appear on the Fillmore East performances box set Songs for Groovy Children: The Fillmore East Concerts.

Critical reception

In a review for AllMusic, Sean Westergaard gave Machine Gun four out of five stars.  He singles out the performances of "Hear My Train A Comin'" (previously released), "Machine Gun",  and "Bleeding Heart" as "amazing" and "stunning".  Engineer Eddie Kramer receives credit for "a truly excellent mix".  Westergaard concludes with:

Track listing

Personnel
Jimi Hendrixvocals, guitar
Billy Coxbass guitar, backing vocals
Buddy Milesdrums, vocals

Charts

References

2016 live albums
Live albums published posthumously
Jimi Hendrix live albums